Jaki Irvine is an Irish contemporary visual artist, specialising in music and video installations, and a novelist. She shares time between Dublin and Mexico City.

Work 
Art in America writes: "Her works manage to wear their own artifice openly, even awkwardly, without becoming reductively trite or archly postmodern. They seduce us even as they reveal the tricks of their seduction. This is the beguiling—and redeeming—paradox of her art."

Her practice is considered difficult to define, however "music has been an important component of Irvine’s work", a recent example of this type of work includes the lauded If the Ground Should Open.  It was commissioned "for the centenary of the Easter Rising and, specifically, the subsequent understated role of women in the rebellion" at the Irish Museum of Modern Art. This installation included many videos of musicians and singers performing scores composed by Irvine. She has used neon in some of her work. In her film installations she implements 16 mm film and 8 mm film, weaving real events with fictitious narratives.

Career 
She represented Ireland at the Venice Biennale in 1997 with Alastair Mac Lennan. In 2013 she wrote a novel, Days of Surrender, a fictional account of women in the Easter Rising. Irvine elaborated on the book through a video, music, and photography installation commissioned by the Irish Museum of Modern Art and shown also at Frith Street Gallery in 2016, called If the Ground Should Open. In 2018, her work was exhibited in Dwelling Poetically: Mexico City, a case study, curated by Chris Sharp in Melbourne, Australia. Irvine's solo exhibition, Ack Ro’, shown at the Kerlin, opened in January 2020 and features 28 neon signs, using lyrical fragments from Neil Diamond’s song Cracklin’ Rosie, as well as a number of video works.

Irvine is a member of Aosdána, is represented by the Kerlin Gallery (Dublin) and Frith Street Gallery (London), and has works in the collection of the Irish Museum of Modern Art.

Bibliography 
 Irvine, Jaki. Days of surrender. Ventnor, Isle of Wight: Copy Press, 2013. 
 Irvine, Jaki, Michael Newman, and Sarah Glennie. The square root of minus one is plus or minus i. Milano New York City: Charta, 2008. 
 Cross, Dorothy, et al. Leaves and papers 1-6 : a Gallery 3 project. Dublin: Douglas Hyde Gallery, 2008. ISBN 9781905397099
 Irvine, Jaki. Jaki Irvine : plans for forgotten works : 2 July - 2 October 2005 : Gallery 4 Henry Moore Institute. Leeds: Henry Moore Institute, 2005. 
 Irvine, Jaki. Towards a polar sea [published on the occasion of the exhibition held at the Frith Street Gallery, London, September - October, 2005. London: Frith Street Books, 2005. 
 Nelson, Mike, and Jaki Irvine. Mike Nelson : extinction beckons. London: Matt's Gallery, 2000. ISBN 0907623344

See also 
 Video art
 Installation art

References

External links 
 
 Frith Street Gallery
 Kerlin Gallery
 IMMA

Irish contemporary artists
Living people
Year of birth uncertain
Irish women artists
Artists from Dublin (city)
1966 births

21st-century Irish women artists